Listeria fleischmannii is a species of bacteria. It is a Gram-positive, facultatively anaerobic, non-motile, non-spore-forming bacillus. It is non-pathogenic and non-hemolytic. The species was first isolated in 2006 in Switzerland from hard cheese. The species is named after Wilhelm Fleischmann, a pioneer in the research of dairy products.

Listeria fleischmannii can be differentiated from other species of Listeria by its ability to ferment both D-mannitol and D-xylose.

References

External links
Type strain of Listeria fleischmannii at BacDive -  the Bacterial Diversity Metadatabase

fleischmannii
Bacteria described in 2006